Selfie is a 2022 Indian Tamil-language action thriller film directed by debutant Mathi Maran and produced by DG Film Company. The film stars G. V. Prakash Kumar and Gautham Vasudev Menon with a supporting cast including Varsha Bollamma, Vidya Pradeep, Vagai Chandrasekhar, Sangili Murugan and Subramaniam Siva. The film's music is composed by G. V. Prakash Kumar himself, with cinematography handled by Vishnu Rangasamy and editing done by S. Elayaraja. The film was released in theatres on 1 April 2022. The film received generally positive reviews from critics and audience and became a commercial success with praise for story, dialogues and GV Prakash Kumar and Gautham Vasudev Menon's performance.

Plot
Kanal (G. V. Prakash Kumar) is a hot-headed engineering student at a low-level college. He holds a grudge against his overbearing father who forced him to study engineering just for the sake of prestige when he actually wanted to pursue something business related. When he finds out that his father paid a bribe through a college admission brocket to get him a place at the college, he becomes determined to investigate it further. He quickly finds out that the underground college admissions racket in Chennai is both a thriving business and an open secret. When a distant relative of a close friend approaches Kanal and his gang for help to get his son a place at a prestigious medical college in the city, they go all out to prove themselves worthy. However, after securing the place, the client pulls out and demands his money back. When Nazir, Kanal's best friend refuses to cooperate, things get out of hand. The client approaches Ravi Varma  (Gautham Vasudev Menon), the most powerful college admission broker in the city whose name Kanal's gang used to secure the position in the first place. Consequently, gangsters and loan sharks start harassing not only Kanal and his friends, but even their families. Nazir eventually makes a decision that will change Kanal and all their friends' lives forever.

Cast

Production

Development 
DG Film Company began a new film venture directed by Mathi Maran, a former associate of Vetrimaaran and featuring G. V. Prakash Kumar in the lead role during May 2020. The film was titled as Selfie.

Casting 
There were reports which were suggesting that Gautham Vasudev Menon would be a part of the film as antagonist.

Music

G. V. Prakash Kumar composed the soundtrack and background score. The first single "Oorkaran" was released on 11 February 2022. The second single "Imaikkariye" was released on 8 March 2022. The third single "Badass Bossman" was released on 18 March 2022. The full album jukebox was released on 21 March 2022.

Release 
The trailer of the film was released on 2 December 2021.  The film was released in theaters on 1 April 2022.

Home Media
The post-theatricial digital rights of the film were sold to Aha.The film was digitally released on 15th April 2022 via  Aha

Reception
Sruthi Raman of The Times of India who gave 3 out of 5 stars after reviewing the film stated that "As much as the film tries to explore an unexplored topic, it sometimes falters to keep up with the pace it starts off with—this is apparent especially in the climax, where the much-awaited loose ends are tied up with rushed sequences". Bhuvanesh Chandar of Cinema Express who gave 3.5 out of 5 stars after reviewing the film stated that "Debutant Mathi Maran has clearly made the most of his resources and a largely new cast to deliver a serious, self-aware film that depends largely on its good writing". Bharathy Singaravel of The News Minute who gave 3 out of 5 stars after reviewing the film stated that "On the whole Selfie is a laudable first attempt by Mathi Maran, who has previously been associated with director Vetrimaaran". Thamizhill Padikka of Indiaglitz who gave 3.5 out of 5 stars after reviewing the film stated that "Go for this realistic take on the education mafia which is highly engaging and educative at the same time". Haricharan Pudipeddi of Hindustan Times wrote that "Despite the initial lag, the film picks up after Kanal’s character gets involved in the chaos. The film has a heavy hangover of Vetrimaaran’s Pollathavan, especially in its style and some action scenes. Two action sequences which take place inside a room stand out and serve as the talking points of the movie. The climax does feel rushed but the fact that the film doesn’t try and glorify Kanal’s character by the end deserves some praise." Behindwoods gave 2.75 out of 5 and stated "GV Prakash's Selfie is an engaging never seen before premise. Try not to miss!"

However, Critic from Maalai Malar noted that "Director Madhi is bound by scenes that cannot be guessed as to what will happen next after a clear screenplay. The fake parents scene is a good twist. Madhimaran has done a good job among the characters."

References

External links
 

2022 films
2022 action thriller films
Indian action thriller films
2020s Tamil-language films
2022 directorial debut films